The 2012–13 Holy Cross Crusaders men's basketball team represented the College of the Holy Cross during the 2012–13 NCAA Division I men's basketball season. The Crusaders, led by third year head coach Milan Brown, played their home games at the Hart Center and were members of the Patriot League. They finished the season 12–18, 4–10 in Patriot League play to finish in seventh place. They lost in the quarterfinals of the Patriot League tournament to Lafayette.

Roster

Schedule

|-
!colspan=9| Exhibition

|-
!colspan=9| Regular season

|-
!colspan=9| 2013 Patriot League men's basketball tournament

References

Holy Cross Crusaders men's basketball seasons
Holy Cross
Holy Cross Crusaders men's basketball
Holy Cross Crusaders men's basketball